The Argentina women's national under-18 volleyball team represents Argentina in women's under-18 volleyball events, it is controlled and managed by the Argentinian Volleyball federation that is a member of South American volleyball body Confederación Sudamericana de Voleibol (CSV) and the international volleyball body government the Fédération Internationale de Volleyball (FIVB).

Results

Summer Youth Olympics
 Champions   Runners up   Third place   Fourth place

FIVB U18 World Championship
 Champions   Runners up   Third place   Fourth place

South America U18 Championship
 Champions   Runners up   Third place   Fourth place

Pan-American U18 Cup
 Champions   Runners up   Third place   Fourth place

Team

Current squad

The following is the Argentinian roster in the 2017 FIVB Girls' U18 World Championship.

Head coach: Estanislao Vachino

References

External links
www.feva.org.ar 

Volleyball
National women's under-18 volleyball teams
Volleyball in Argentina